Keler or Kéler may refer to:
 Keler (beer), a variety of the Estrella Damm lager, brewed in Barcelona, Spain
 Béla Kéler (1820-1882), a Hungarian composer and conductor
 Bohuš Keler (born 1961), a Czech football manager and former player